Blangpidie Kuala Batee Airport (Indonesia:Bandar Udara Blangpidie Kuala Batee)  is an airport serving the city of Blangpidie, capital of the Southwest Aceh Regency, Aceh, Indonesia.

Airlines and destinations

See also
List of airports in Indonesia

References

Airports in Aceh